Dutch Post-Impressionist painter Vincent van Gogh painted a self-portrait in oil on canvas in September 1889. The work, which may have been Van Gogh's last self-portrait, was painted shortly before he left Saint-Rémy-de-Provence in southern France. The painting is now at the Musée d'Orsay in Paris.

Painting

This self-portrait was one of about 32 produced over a 10-year period, and these were an important part of his work as a painter; he painted himself because he often lacked the money to pay for models. He took the painting with him to Auvers-sur-Oise, near Paris, where he showed it to Dr. Paul Gachet, who thought it was "absolutely fanatical".

Art historians are divided as to whether this painting or Self-portrait without beard is Van Gogh's final art historians Ingo F. Walther and Jan Hulsker consider this to be the last, with Hulsker considering that it was painted in Arles following Van Gogh's admission to hospital after mutilating his ear, while Ronald Pickvance thinks Self-portrait without beard was the later painting.

Van Gogh sent the picture to his younger brother, the art dealer Theo; an accompanying letter read: "You will need to study [the picture] for a time. I hope you will notice that my facial expressions have become much calmer, although my eyes have the same insecure look as before, or so it appears to me."

Walther and Rainer Metzger consider that "the picture is not a pretty pose nor a realistic record ... [it is] one that has seen too much jeopardy, too much turmoil, to be able to keep its agitation and trembling under control." According to Beckett the dissolving colours and same time turbulent patterns signal a feeling of strain and pressure, symbolising the artist's state of mind, which is under a mental, physical and emotional pressure.

The Musée d'Orsay in Paris, who obtained the picture in 1986, noted that "the model's immobility contrasts with the undulating hair and beard, echoed and amplified in the hallucinatory arabesques of the background."

The Oslo Self-Portrait (1889)

Another self-portrait from 1889, often called the Oslo self-portrait because it is owned by the Nasjonalmuseet in Norway, was authenticated in 2020 by the Van Gogh Museum. This painting, with the artist looking sideways, was painted while the artist was in the asylum in Saint-Rémy and is "unmistakeably" his work. Experts believe it was painted after Van Gogh's letter of 22 August 1889, which indicated that he was still "disturbed" but ready to begin painting again. It was completed prior to his letter of 20 September 1889, in which Van Gogh referred to the self-portrait as "an attempt from when I was ill".

The Museum's report stated that "The Oslo self-portrait depicts someone who is mentally ill; his timid, sideways glance is easily recognisable and is often found in patients suffering from depression and psychosis".

References

Sources

See also
 Art movement
 Impressionists
 Paul Gauguin

1889 paintings
Paintings in the collection of the Musée d'Orsay
Paintings by Vincent van Gogh
Self-portraits by Vincent van Gogh